Girondelle is a commune in the Ardennes department and Grand Est region of north-eastern France.

Geography
The river Sormonne flows through the commune.

Population

See also
Communes of the Ardennes department

References

Communes of Ardennes (department)
Ardennes communes articles needing translation from French Wikipedia